The Island-class patrol boat is a class of cutters of the United States Coast Guard. 49 cutters of the class were built, of which 37 remain in commission. Their hull numbers are WPB-1301 through WPB-1349.

Overview
The  Island-class patrol boats are a U.S. Coast Guard modification of a highly successful British-designed Vosper Thornycroft patrol boat built for Qatar, Abu Dhabi, and Singapore. With excellent range and seakeeping capabilities, the Island class, all named after U.S. islands, replaced the older  s. These cutters are equipped with advanced electronics and navigation equipment and are used in support of the Coast Guard's maritime homeland security, migrant interdiction, drug interdiction, defense operations, fisheries enforcement, and search and rescue missions. The 58 ordered s, selected under the Fast Response Cutter (FRC) program, are slated to replace the Island class. Six Island class cutters are currently stationed in Manama, Bahrain as a part of Patrol Forces Southwest Asia to provide the Navy's Fifth Fleet with combat ready assets. The cutters have 10 tons worth of space and weight reservations for additional weapons.

Conversion problems
As built, these vessels were all  in length. In 2002 as part of the Integrated Deepwater System Program, the Coast Guard began refitting some of these vessels, adding  to the stern to make room for a high-speed stern launching ramp, and replacing the superstructure so that these vessels had enough room to accommodate mixed-gender crews. The refit added about 15 tons to the vessel's displacement, and reduced its maximum speed by approximately one knot. The eight cutters modified were; 

 

In 2005, then-Coast Guard Commandant Admiral Thomas H. Collins made the decision to stop the contractor's conversion at eight hulls when sea trials revealed intractable structural flaws.

In August 2006, a Lockheed Martin engineer went public with allegations that the company and the Coast Guard were ignoring serious security flaws in the refitting project, and that they were likely to repeat the same mistakes on similar projects. The flaws included blind spots in watch cameras, FLIR equipment not suitable for operating under extreme temperatures, and the use of non-shielded cables in secure communications systems, a violation of TEMPEST standards.

In late November 2006 all eight of the  WPBs were taken out of service due to debilitating problems with their lengthened hulls – all eight hulls were cracking when driven at high speed in heavy seas. These as well as other issues – such as C4ISR problems – drove the program $60 million over budget, triple the original bid for the eight boats converted. The 41 unmodified 110s are now being pressed harder to take up the slack. The eight modified were moved to the United States Coast Guard Yard and moored in Arundel Cove.

Transfers to foreign operators

The U.S. Coast Guard has transferred several ships to foreign navies and coast guards via the 
Defense Security Cooperation Agency's Office of International Acquisition's Excess Defense Articles Program (EDA).

Operators 
 United States Coast Guard
 Georgian Coast Guard – two ships via EDA in September 2016
 Pakistan Maritime Security Agency – two ships via EDA in 2016
 Costa Rican Coast Guard – two ships via EDA in 2017
 Sea Shepherd Conservation Society – purchased former USCGC Block Island and Pea Island, June 2015, and Bainbridge Island, November 2017.
 Ukrainian Navy – five acquired from the USCG

Future Operators 

 Hellenic Coast Guard
Greece will receive three Island-class patrol boats from the United States Coast Guard under the EDA agreement.

Dispositions

Gallery

See also 
 USCG 
 USCG Short Range Prosecutor
 USCG 
 USCG

References

External links 

Video of the Matagorda deploying and retrieving her Short Range Prosecutor pursuit launch at speed.
Official description of the conversion from 110 to 123 feet.

Patrol vessels of the United States
 
Patrol boat classes